{{DISPLAYTITLE:C12H22O10}}
The molecular formula C12H22O10 (molar mass: 326.29 g/mol, exact mass: 326.121297 u) may refer to:

 Neohesperidose or 2-O-alpha-L-Rhamnopyranosyl-D-glucopyranose
 Robinose
 Rutinose or 6-O-alpha-L-Rhamnopyranosyl-D-glucupyranose